This is a list of islands of Cuba. Cuba consists of over 4,000 islands and cays surrounding the country's main island, many of which make up archipelagos. Off the south coast are two main archipelagos, Jardines de la Reina and the Canarreos Archipelago. The Sabana-Camagüey Archipelago runs along the northern coast and contains roughly 2,517 cays and islands. The Colorados Archipelago is located off the north-western coast. The following is an incomplete list of the islands of Cuba.

See also

List of Caribbean islands

References

External links

 List of islands of Cuba
Cuba